Gonobhaban Government High School is a government secondary school in Dhaka, Bangladesh. It was established as "Sher-e-Bangla Nagar Government Junior High School" on March 1, 1980. It is beside the area of Prime Minister's residence Gonobhaban in Sher-e-Bangla Nagor. It is for both boys and girls, with girls in the morning and boys with day sessions.

Structure 
Gonobhaban Government High School is situated at College Gate (beside Prime Minister's residence) in Dhaka city. The school enrolls students from grades 1–10. The school operates two shift. Girls are in morning shift and boys are in day shift. Morning shift generally starts at 7.30am and ends at 12.00pm. Again day shift starts at 12.30pm and ends at 5.15pm. For both shift, there exist one section from class 1-5 and there exist two shift from class 6–10. There is a single building of this school. It's a three storeyed building and this building shaped like English word H. In average, each section has 60 students. The school is full of plenty of nature. There is a big playing ground for students. In every year, more than 250 students appear in the public Junior School Certificate (JSC) and Secondary School Certificate (SSC) examination.

Admission
Under the control of ‘Directorate General of Secondary and Higher Education, Dhaka’ admission lottery of all the government schools of Dhaka city are taken. There is no intense competition in the admission process of class 1. But in other classes one has to participate in 'admission test' for the chance of admission to this school. Usually students are admitted in all class (except 10). The admission test is taken usually in December after the 'Annual exam' ( also called yearly exam) of the school.

References 

Educational institutions established in 1980
High schools in Bangladesh
Schools in Dhaka